Vineyard Records UK (VRUK) is the worship ministry of Vineyard Churches UK and Ireland (VCUKI). It is a not-for profit music label that exists to document and release worship songs that are being written in the Vineyard UK church movement.

History 
Originally established in 1998 as Vineyard Music (UK) a division of Vineyard Music worldwide the organisation rebranded in 2005 to become known as Vineyard Records UK. VRUK have released a number of worship albums since 1998, their most well known being the Come Now is the Time to Worship (1998) and Hungry (1999) albums.

Artists who have recorded for Vineyard Records UK include:

 Vicky Beeching
 Nigel Briggs
 Brenton Brown
 Brian Doerksen
 Great Big God (Kids Ministry)
 Samuel Lane
 Kathryn Scott
 Nigel Hemming
 Harmony Smith
 Trent Band

References

External links 
 

Christian record labels
Association of Vineyard Churches